DeGrenier is a surname. Notable people with the surname include:

Chad DeGrenier (born 1973), American football player
Jack DeGrenier (born 1951), American football player